Nudrat Afza is a photographer who has concentrated on documenting community life in and near Bradford, where she lives.

Life and career
Afza was born in Rawalpindi in 1955; she moved to Bradford in 1964. In 1986 Yorkshire Arts awarded her a grant to document the Bangladeshi community in Bradford. From 1989 to 1990 she worked on an exhibition at Huddersfield Art Gallery about South Asian communities in Kirklees. She has been a full time carer for over 30 years for her daughter, who has had a serious liver disorder. Since becoming a carer, she has not been able to afford her own camera, and has depended on grants and the loans of equipment.

Afza guessed in 2011 that the owner of a hair salon might be approaching retirement, asked if she might photograph it, was permitted to do so, and learned that the owner indeed planned to sell up. For one year, she photographed the salon and its customers, many of whom had been going there for decades. The work was exhibited at the University of Bradford.

Afza first watched soccer when she accompanied her daughter to a Bradford City match; she was immediately struck by the number and enthusiasm of the female fans. For her series City Girls, she photographed female fans of Bradford City in the Valley Parade stadium in black and white, using a Hasselblad Xpan camera given to her by Simon Beaufoy.

From 2018 to 2019, Afza, a Muslim, photographed the Bradford Tree of Life Synagogue in Manningham, Bradford's last synagogue, and the people attending it before and after services. In 2013 this Grade II* listed building had needed expensive repair work and the synagogue's few members could not afford repairs; the Bradford Council for Mosques was among the organizations that contributed to preserve the building. Afza wanted to document the culture, which decades earlier had thrived in Bradford, before it disappeared. Under the title Kehillah (Hebrew for congregation or community), the photographs were exhibited in 2019. She is now an honorary member of the synagogue.

Simon Beaufoy commented on Kehillah:

Like all the best art, the images reflect the artist: watchful, politely enquiring, melancholic with the hint of a smile. So unobtrusive is the photographer's eye, that it's easy to miss what is being explored. There is always warmth and empathy, but often a distant sound of thunder.

Exhibitions

Solo and pair exhibitions
Zones of Gold: For Emily. With Conrad Atkinson. Cartwright Hall, Bradford. September–November 1992.
Midnight Hour. University of Bradford.
The Salon. Gallery II, University of Bradford. September–November 2012.
City Girls. National Science and Media Museum, November 2017 – June 2018.
Kehillah. Salts Mill, Saltaire, Bradford (Saltaire festival), September 2019.

Group exhibitions
5 Women. The Pavilion, Leeds, 1988–89.
Fabled Territories: New Asian photography in Britain. City Art Gallery, Leeds, and touring. 1989.
In Focus. Horizon Gallery, London, February–March 1990. With Mumtaj Karimjee, Zarina Bhimji and Pradipta Das.
One Hundred Years of Cheetham and Broughton. Jewish Museum, Manchester, February–December 2001.
Local People. City Park, Bradford. July–August 2019. With Ian Beesley, Shy Burhan, John Cade, Phil Jackson and Justin Leeming.

References

1955 births
Living people
People from Rawalpindi
Artists from Bradford
Pakistani expatriates in England
Social documentary photographers
English women photographers
Photographers from Yorkshire

Women photojournalists